Roggerio Nyakossi (born 13 January 2004) is a Swiss professional footballer who plays as a centre-back for Marseille II.

Career
On 4 November 2020, Nyakossi signed his first professional contract with Servette FC. He made his professional debut with Servette in a 5–1 Swiss Super League loss to Basel 8 August 2021, coming on as a late sub in the 77th minute.

Personal life
Born in Switzerland, Nyakossi is of Togolese descent.

References

External links
 
 SFL Profile
 Football.ch U17 Profile

2004 births
Living people
Footballers from Geneva
Swiss men's footballers
Swiss people of Togolese descent
Swiss sportspeople of African descent
Servette FC players
Swiss Super League players
Association football defenders